{{Infobox train
| name = Renfe Class 120/121
| image = Alvia_120-861_Madrid-Hendaya.jpg
| caption = Renfe 120-6051 at Valladolid - Campo Grande (Valladolid)
| interiorimage = 
| interiorcaption = 
| service = 
| manufacturer = CAF / Alstom
| factory = 
| family = 
| replaced = 
| yearconstruction = 2001 (order date) 12 units2004 (order date) 45 units
| yearservice = 
| refurbishment = 
| yearscrapped = 
| numberconstruction = 
| numberbuilt = 
| numberservice = 
| numberpreserved = 
| numberscrapped = 
| formation = 4-car setsMCT-MIT-MIP-MCP (120)Mc-M-M-Mc (121)
| fleetnumbers = 
| capacity = Class 120: 237 (+1 reserved)Class 121: 280 (+2)
| operator = Renfe
| depots = 
| lines = 
| carbody = Aluminium
| trainlength = 
| carlength =  (end cars) (intermediate cars) 
| width = 
| height = 
| floorheight = 
| platformheight = 
| entrylevelorstep = 
| doors = 1 per side
| maxspeed = 
| weight =  empty)

29 units of the class Renfe Class 121 were ordered for medium-distance high-speed Avant services. The units are very similar to the Class 120 but include additional electrical equipment for redundancy (a requirement for trains using the Guadarrama Tunnel), and do not provide first class seating, raising the number of seats to 282.

Design

Class 120 
The trainsets are 4-unit multiple units capable of operating in pairs, designed for medium-distance high-speed services. The inner axle of each carriage bogie is powered by a body mounted three phase asynchronous traction motor via a cardan shaft final drive. The motors are driven by IGBT converters with one converter per carriage. The bogies are of welded steel construction with primary coil springs and secondary air suspension. Tractive forces are transmitted by a drag pivot pin.

The vehicles are air conditioned with one toilet per car. Passenger services include individual audio systems, and audio and visual information systems. One seat is reserved for disabled passengers, and wheelchair ramps are fitted. The driver's cab is also air conditioned, and the train is equipped with GSM-R systems.

There are 156 seats in 'standard' accommodation and 82 seats in 'first class'.

Class 121 
The 121 class are built to the same design as the original 120 Class but have additional electrical equipment (duplicated for redundancy). Additionally all the seating is in [2+2] formation increasing the capacity to 282.

Operations

Class 120 
The first trainset was produced in 2004 and began testing. Services on the Madrid to Barcelona line began in 2006.

The trainsets have operated on the Madrid-Pamplona-Hendaye, Madrid-Logroño, Barcelona-Vigo and Barcelona-Bilbao/Irun lines.

Class 121 
The first trains entered service on the Madrid-Segovia-Valladolid line on 26 January 2009. They are currently used for the Avant services Barcelona-Lleida, A Coruña-Ourense and Zaragoza-Calatayud.

Related vehicles 
The 6-car TCDD HT65000 electric multiple units ordered from CAF by the Turkish State Railways for the Istanbul-Ankara high-speed line are based upon the Class 120 design.

See also 
 High-speed rail in Spain
 List of high-speed trains

References

Further reading 
 RENFE Class 120 and 121 in detail (spanish language) publisher: Via Libre, 11/2009, via www.caf.net

External links 

 Images of Renfe Class 120 trains fototrenes.tranvia.org

Renfe high-speed trains
Electric multiple units of Spain
25 kV AC multiple units
3000 V DC multiple units
Passenger trains running at least at 250 km/h in commercial operations
CAF multiple units
Alstom multiple units